Jan Van der Roost (born Duffel, 1956) is a Belgian composer.

Van der Roost was educated at the Lemmensinstituut in Leuven (1974-1979), and followed further studies at the Royal Conservatory in Ghent and the Royal Flemish Conservatory in Antwerp. Since 1984 Van der Roost is a professor of counterpoint and fugue at the Lemmensinstituut. He currently also is a guest professor at the Shobi Institute of Music, Tokyo and the Nagoya University of Arts.

Jan Van der Roost has composed over 90 works; most are for winds, like brass band, fanfare, and concert band, but some are for orchestra or choir. He has also dabbled in composing various pieces in the style of late 17th- to early 18th-century dance music, and is often cited by Tom Collier and Tom Slabaugh in their lectures as a prime example of music transformation.

Works
 1834 (Concert band)
 A Highland Rhapsody (Concert band)
 A Highland Rhapsody (Fanfare)
 A Year Has Four Lives (Children's choir)
 Adagio for Brass (Brass band)
 Adagio for Winds (Concert band)
 Adagio for Winds (Fanfare)
 Albion (Brass band)
 Algona Overture (Concert band)
 Amazonia (Concert band)
 Apollo 
 Arghulesques (for Clarinet Quartet)
 Arpád (part 2 from 'Sinfonia Hungarica')
 Arsenal
 Attila! (part 1 from 'Sinfonia Hungarica')
 Autumn 
 Avalon 
 Balkanya 
 Ballad for Bass Trombone 
 Bassonnerie 
 Beata viscera
 Brasiliana
 By the River 
 Cantabile e Ritmico
 Canterbury Chorale
 Canzona gothica (for Trombone)
 Castellum
 Céad Míle Fáilte 
 Centennial Prelude
 Ceremonial March
 Chemical Suite (for Trombone quartet)
 Christmas Time
 Concerto Doppio (Per due clarinetti e piano 4 aspetti sonori)
 Concerto Grosso (for Cornet, Trombone and Concert band)
 Concerto per Tromba
 Concierto de Homenaje (for guitar and piano)
 Concordia
 Condacum
 Contemplations
 Contrasto Grosso (For Recorder Quartet and String Quartet)
 Conzensus
 Coventry Carol (From Joy To The World)
 Credentium 
 Crescent Moon (Concert Band)
 Cuprioles 
 Domus
 Donar
 Dublin Dances
 Dynamica
 Flashing Winds (Concert Band)
 Glorioso
 Images (Rental) (For Alto Saxophone and Orchestra)
 Jupiter
 Manhattan Pictures
 Mercury
 Metalla
 Montana March
 Nobilitas
 Orion
 Osakan Jubilee 
 Puszta: Four Gipsy Dances
 Rikudim
 Signature
 Singapura Suite
 Sonatina Piccola (for piccolo and piano) - commissioned by and dedicated to Peter Verhoyen
 Spartacus - Symphonic Tone Poem
 Tirol Terra Fortis
 Volcano
 
 
 
 
 
 
 
 
 
 
 
 
 
 
 
 

This list is currently incomplete; you can help by going to www.janvanderroost.com/en/work/ and adding more of his compositions in alphabetical order.

External links
 

1956 births
Living people
20th-century classical composers
20th-century Belgian male musicians
21st-century classical composers
21st-century male musicians
Belgian classical composers
Belgian male classical composers
Brass band composers
Concert band composers
People from Duffel